Susannah Yolande Fletcher (9 January 1939 – 15 January 2011), known professionally as Susannah York, was an English actress. Her appearances in various films of the 1960s, including Tom Jones (1963) and They Shoot Horses, Don't They? (1969), formed the basis of her international reputation. An obituary in The Telegraph characterised her as "the blue-eyed English rose with the china-white skin and cupid lips who epitomised the sensuality of the swinging sixties", who later "proved that she was a real actor of extraordinary emotional range".

York's early films included The Greengage Summer (1961) and Freud (1962). She received a nomination for the Academy Award for Best Supporting Actress for They Shoot Horses, Don't They? She also won the 1972 Cannes Film Festival Award for Best Actress for Images. Her other film appearances included Sands of the Kalahari (1965), A Man for All Seasons (1966), The Killing of Sister George (1968), Battle of Britain (1969), Jane Eyre (1970), Zee and Co. (1972), Gold (1974), The Maids (1975), Conduct Unbecoming (1975), Eliza Fraser (1976), The Shout (1978), The Silent Partner (1978) and Superman (1978). She was appointed an Officier de L'Ordre des Arts et des Lettres in 1991.

Early life
York was born in Chelsea, London, in 1939, the younger daughter of Simon William Peel Vickers Fletcher (1910–2002), a merchant banker and steel magnate, and his first wife, the former Joan Nita Mary Bowring. They married in 1935, and divorced prior to 1943. Her maternal grandfather was Walter Andrew Bowring, CBE, a British diplomat who served as Administrator of Dominica (1933–1935); she was a great-great-granddaughter of political economist Sir John Bowring. York had an elder sister, as well as a half-brother, Eugene Xavier Charles William Peel Fletcher, from her father's second marriage to Pauline de Bearnez de Morton de La Chapelle.

In early 1943, her mother married a Scottish businessman, Adam M. Hamilton, and moved, with her daughter, to Scotland. At the age of 11, York entered Marr College in Troon, Ayrshire. Later, she became a boarder at Wispers School in Midhurst, Sussex. At 13, she was removed, effectively expelled, from Wispers after admitting to a nude midnight swim in the school pool, and she transferred to East Haddon Hall in Northamptonshire.

Enthusiastic about her experiences of acting at school (she had played an ugly sister in Cinderella at the age of nine), York first decided to apply to the Glasgow College of Dramatic Art, but after her mother had separated from her stepfather and moved to London, she instead auditioned for the Royal Academy of Dramatic Art. At RADA, where her classmates included Peter O'Toole, Albert Finney, Tom Courtenay and future Beatles manager Brian Epstein, she won the Ronson award for most promising student before graduating in 1958.

Career

Film

Her film career began with Tunes of Glory (1960), co-starring with Alec Guinness and John Mills. In 1961, she played the leading role in The Greengage Summer, which co-starred Kenneth More and Danielle Darrieux. In 1962, she performed in Freud: The Secret Passion with Montgomery Clift in the title role.

York played Sophie Western opposite Albert Finney in the Oscar-winning Best Film Tom Jones (1963). She had turned the part down three times and only agreed to participate because she felt guilty over cooking a disastrous meal for the director Tony Richardson, who was determined not to accept her refusal. She also appeared in The 7th Dawn (1964) with William Holden, Kaleidescope (1966), A Man for All Seasons (1966), The Killing of Sister George (1968) and Battle of Britain (1969). In 1970 she co-starred with George C. Scott (as Edward Rochester), playing the title role in an American television movie of Jane Eyre, and played opposite Peter O'Toole in Country Dance.

York was nominated for a Best Supporting Actress Oscar for They Shoot Horses, Don't They? (1969). She snubbed the Academy when, regarding her nomination, she declared it offended her to be nominated without being asked. She was highly praised for her performance, though she said "I don't think much of the film, or of myself in it." She did attend the ceremony but lost to Goldie Hawn for her role in Cactus Flower.

In 1972, she won the Best Actress award at the Cannes Film Festival for her role in Images. She played Superman's mother Lara on the doomed planet Krypton in Superman (1978) and its sequels, Superman II (1980) and Superman IV: The Quest for Peace (1987). York made extensive appearances in British television series, including Prince Regent (1979), as Maria Fitzherbert, the clandestine wife of the future George IV, and We'll Meet Again (1982).

In 1984, York starred as Mrs. Cratchit in A Christmas Carol (1984), based on the novel by Charles Dickens. She again co-starred with George C. Scott (as Ebenezer Scrooge), David Warner (Bob Cratchit), Frank Finlay (Jacob Marley), Angela Pleasence (The Ghost of Christmas Past) and Anthony Walters (Tiny Tim).

In 1992, she was a member of the jury at the 42nd Berlin International Film Festival.

In 2003, York had a recurring role as hospital manager Helen Grant in the BBC1 television drama series Holby City. She reprised this role in two episodes of Holby City'''s sister series Casualty in May 2004. Her last film was The Calling, released in 2010 in the UK.

She was a patron of the Children's Film Unit and appeared in several of their films.

Stage

In 1978, York appeared on stage at the New End Theatre in London in The Singular Life of Albert Nobbs with Lucinda Childs, directed by French director Simone Benmussa. This was the first of 10 projects she completed with the producer Richard Jackson. The following year, she appeared in Paris, speaking French in a play by Henry James: Appearances, with Sami Frey. The play was again directed by Benmussa.

In the 1980s, again with Benmussa, York played in For No Good Reason, an adaptation of George Moore's short story, with Susan Hampshire. In 1985, she appeared in Fatal Attraction by Bernard Slade at the Theatre Royal Haymarket. In 1986-87, York starred as Mary in Claire Boothe's The Women at the Old Vic, a production that included Maria Aitken, Diana Quick and Georgina Hale.

In 2007, she appeared in the UK tour of The Wings of the Dove, and continued performing her internationally well received solo show, The Loves of Shakespeare's Women. Also in 2007, she guest starred in the Doctor Who audio play Valhalla. In 2008, she played the part of Nelly in an adaptation by April De Angelis of Wuthering Heights.

According to the website of Italian symphonic metal band Rhapsody of Fire (previously known as Rhapsody), York had been recruited for a narrated part on the band's next full-length album Triumph or Agony. In 2009, she starred alongside Jos Vantyler in the Tennessee Williams season at the New End Theatre, London for which she received critical acclaim.

York's last stage performance was as Jean in Ronald Harwood's Quartet, at the Oxford Playhouse in August 2010.

Writing and personal appearances
In the 1970s, York wrote two children's fantasy novels, In Search of Unicorns (1973, revised 1984) which was excerpted in the film Images, and Lark's Castle (1976, revised 1986).

She was a guest, along with David Puttnam on the BBC Radio 4 documentary I Had The Misery Thursday, a tribute programme to film actor Montgomery Clift, which was aired in 1986, on the 20th anniversary of Clift's death. York had co-starred with him in Freud: The Secret Passion, John Huston's 1962 film biography of the psychoanalyst.

Personal life
In 1959, York married Michael Wells, with whom she had two children: daughter Sasha (born May 1972), and son Orlando (born June 1973). They divorced in 1976. In the 1984 TV adaptation of A Christmas Carol, she played Mrs. Cratchit and both of her children co-starred as Cratchit offspring. York's first grandchild by way of Orlando was born in 2007.

Politically, she was left-leaning, and publicly supported Mordechai Vanunu, the Israeli dissident who revealed Israel's nuclear weapons programme. While performing The Loves of Shakespeare's Women at the Cameri Theatre in Tel Aviv in June 2007, York dedicated the performance to Vanunu, evoking both cheers and jeers from the audience.

Death
Diagnosed with cancer late in 2010, York refused chemotherapy and honoured a contractual obligation to appear in Ronald Harwood's Quartet''. She died at the Royal Marsden Hospital in London from multiple myeloma on 15 January 2011, six days after her 72nd birthday.

TV and filmography

References

External links

1939 births
2011 deaths
20th-century English actresses
21st-century English actresses
Actresses from London
Alumni of RADA
Best Supporting Actress BAFTA Award winners
Cannes Film Festival Award for Best Actress winners
Deaths from cancer in England
Deaths from multiple myeloma
English film actresses
English stage actresses
English television actresses
Officiers of the Ordre des Arts et des Lettres
People educated at Wispers School
People from Chelsea, London
People educated at Marr College
Royal Shakespeare Company members